Alan Gordon Marley (b 1959) was Dean of Cloyne between 2003 and 2017.

He was educated at Dulwich College, the University of Birmingham and Queen's College, Edgbaston. After a curacy at Blandford Forum he was Chaplain at HM YOI Aylesbury from 1993 to 1997. He was the  incumbent at Fermoy from 1997 to 2003; and also Domestic Chaplain to the Bishop of Cork, Cloyne and Ross from 1999 to 2003. He has been a Chaplain at University College Cork from 2018

References

1959 births
Alumni of the University of Birmingham
Alumni of the Queen's Foundation
Irish Anglicans
Deans of Cloyne
Living people